Nick Fallon is a fictional character on the American soap opera Days of Our Lives. The role was played by Blake Berris from November 7, 2006, to January 15, 2009. In May 2012, it was announced that Berris would return to the series. He returned on August 27, 2012. His final air date was May 12, 2014, when the character was killed in a whodunit murder mystery. In 2021, Berris reprised the role in a guest appearance on the soap and in Days of Our Lives: A Very Salem Christmas.

Storylines

Nick, the son of Joshua Fallon and Jessica Blake, comes to Salem to get to know his Horton relatives. His medical knowledge and intelligence are put to the test when he is asked to help save Kayla Brady, who was suffering from a rare ailment. He succeeds in saving her and finds himself intrigued by Kayla's niece, Chelsea Brady. In an attempt to get Chelsea to fall for him, Nick creates an online identity to chat with her and uses a picture of a handsome colleague of his as his own.

Later, Nick helps Chelsea send money to Shawn Brady and Belle Black who are on the run with their daughter Claire in Toronto, Ontario, Canada. Nick's clever and brave actions cause Chelsea to take interest in him. However, shortly after returning from Canada, she discovers Nick is her online love. She is devastated and sees Nick's actions as a malicious trick, thinking that Nick used the online lover to secretly mock her as she revealed her inner thoughts and feelings for the first time. She tearfully tells Nick that she never wants to see him again. Hurt, Nick has an affair with Chelsea's mother Billie Reed, who under the influence of alcohol seduces him. They both regret it and swear never to tell anyone.
 
When Nick saves Chelsea from being raped by Dr. Reibert, whom she is dating to spite Nick, she forgives him. Nick begins tutoring her in math and the two end up dating. Chelsea soon discovers Nick and Billie's one-night stand and their relationship is again in turmoil. Later, when Willow Stark accidentally sets Bo and Hope's house on fire, she panics and attempts to frame Chelsea by planting her hairbrush at the crime scene. At Chelsea's cry of innocence, Nick risks his medical career by stealing the hairbrush out of the forensics lab. Chelsea is so grateful that she is able to forgive Nick for his indiscretion with Billie, and they soon rekindle their romance.

Later, Willow emerges as a threat to Nick and Chelsea's happiness. When Nick steals the hairbrush, it leaves Willow as the only suspect for the fire. Nick feels sorry for her and lends her money. Willow asks for more money, and Nick leases an apartment for her and gives her his credit card to use for her and her baby. Willow uses Nick's credit card excessively, then calls him and blackmails him into giving her more.

Nick goes to the beach to meet Willow and the two get into an argument. In the ensuing struggle she falls, hitting her head on a log. Despite Nick's attempts to revive her, she dies. He finds the hairbrush in her possession and buries it in the sand on the beach before calling for help. While Nick is investigated by detective Roman Brady, he convinces Chelsea to go to the beach and destroy the hairbrush. Roman eventually learns the truth, and gives both Chelsea and Nick a pass by closing the investigation.

Nick is also blackmailed by Kate Roberts into making Sami's amniocentesis say that EJ was the father of Sami's twins.

Nick saves Sami and Lucas Roberts from a bomb that Dr. Rolf planted, sustaining head injuries in the process. While suffering from a concussion, Nick goes to Las Vegas and marries a woman named Cassandra Arvin who is using the alias "China Lee".  Arvin is eventually persuaded to sign annulment papers. She is arrested and goes to jail for soliciting, leaving Nick with custody of her two sons, Artemis and Demarquette. Nick deduces that Artemis and Demarquette are not really China Lee's children, which she confirms upon her release from jail. She had been hired to protect the boys, but refuses to retake custody of them. A man named Umar Abboud comes to Nick's home and claims that he works for the boys' parents and had been sent to bring them home. Nick does not trust Abboud, and Jeremy Horton, who is staying with Nick at the time, successfully fights him off. Weeks later, Chelsea is abducted. She is permitted to use her cell phone only to contact Nick, who is directed to come to a designated location, alone. There the kidnapper offers a hostage exchange: Artemis and Demarquette for Chelsea. Unbeknownst to the man, the boys had followed Nick to the warehouse, but are able to escape. While Nick works to avert the detonation of what turns out to be a fake bomb, Artemis and Demarquette are rescued by Umar Abboud. Abboud is in the employ of the boys' parents, who are wealthy foreigners with many enemies. Having secured political asylum, they wanted to be reunited with their sons; Chelsea's abduction had been a ploy by the family's enemies. Nick agrees to let Artemis and Demarquette go.

Nick and Chelsea reunite. He helps Chelsea find proof that Ford Decker was the campus rapist by breaking into Ford's room in order to take photographs of his drugs and journal. After the campus rapist situation is resolved, Chelsea and Nick grow apart because of her attraction to Dr. Daniel Jonas, and the two eventually break up. Nick then begins working on a research project involving alternative fuel sources and begins a relationship with Max Brady's half-sister, Melanie Layton. Nick ultimately starts stalking her and is later revealed to be the killer of Trent Robbins, Max and Melanie's father.

On January 14, 2009, Nick is tried for the murder of Trent Robbins. Maggie and Melanie give testimony as to why Nick should not receive a life sentence. The judge agrees and sentences Nick to 2 to 5 years in a facility and 18 months for good behavior. Nick is thankful to Melanie for her testimony as she tells Nick she forgives him because deep down he is a good person.

On January 15, 2009, Chelsea comes from the hospital to the courthouse. Nick tells Chelsea he is sorry for everything and tells her to move on with her life. Chelsea tearfully tells Nick that he will always have a piece of her heart and that he can focus on getting better.

On August 27, 2012, Nick returns to Salem and, still in jail, has a parole hearing. Having been recently kidnapped, Melanie does not know how she feels. Against the advice of her family, Melanie decides that Nick really had changed, but wants him to stay away from her. Nick is released and threatened by Chad to stay away. Caroline forgives Nick and gives him a job at the Brady Pub. Chad beats Nick up after believing that he has Melanie, since he has her scarf. Later, Nick meets Melanie's former friend Gabi and they start dating. On November 14, Gabi finds out she is pregnant with her gay ex-boyfriend Will Horton's baby. Nick agrees with Gabi and Will that he will raise the child and that he and Gabi will get married. Nick and Gabi have a church wedding, but before they can be pronounced husband and wife, Chad objects, saying that Nick is not the father of Gabi's baby, and it finally comes out that Will is the father.

At a later date, Nick blackmails Will to give up his parental rights to Arianna by threatening to tell that Will was the one who shot EJ. With several other people around, including Sami, Lucas, EJ, Sonny, and an attorney Nick brings, Will signs the agreement. Nick and Gabi marry in a private ceremony. Only later does Gabi learn that Will gave up his rights to the baby, but she does not learn about the blackmail, though Will tells her he did not want to do it.

Nick has memories of something terrible that happened in jail, possibly involving another inmate, Vargas, who was recently released and is getting help from the church to adjust to regular life. It is later revealed to be repeated prison rape by another inmate named Jensen.

Nick is kidnapped, along with Gabi, and held hostage by Jensen. Will and Sonny save them, with Will getting shot in the process. Nick then tries to make things right, considering that Will almost died to save him, and agrees to have Will's name on Arianna's birth certificate. Nick tells Gabi the truth about his rape and about blackmailing Will.

Nick is fired by Kate in June 2013. In August 2013, when his parole is up, he is told by Victor Kiriakis to vacate the Kiriakis mansion immediately. Nick becomes obsessed with Gabi and gets her a modeling job in New York, where he will be as well, hoping that they can be together. After Gabi yells at him for interfering in her life, he follows her to the park where he tries to rape her. Gabi hits him in the head with a rock and Sami and Kate help her drag Nick's body to the river where he briefly awakes before apparently drowning on November 27.

On January 24, 2014 Nick arrives at Gabi and Will's daughter's baptism revealing that he had not drowned. He appears reformed but soon blackmails Kate into hiring him. Nick also manipulates Gabi into giving him another chance, and she feels that she must do so or risk going to jail for trying to murder Nick. Nick later manipulates EJ DiMera and Sami into giving Gabi a modeling contract with Countess Wilhelmina. Later, Nick gets involved in the custody agreement for Will and Gabi's daughter, pushing Gabi to only let Will see his daughter when she allows it. Will and Sonny feel that Nick would manipulate Gabi until he has her and Ari to himself. In the meantime, EJ finds out that someone had pictures of him and Abigail Deveraux kissing sent to his house. EJ and Abigail later find out that Nick was behind it. On May 9, 2014, Nick is shot three times, once in the back and twice in the chest, and he dies on May 12 with an open investigation into who was responsible. On May 30, 2014, it is revealed that it was Gabi Hernandez who shot Nick.

On Halloween 2021, Nick's corpse was raised as a zombie by the devil-possessed Marlena Evans and was sent to terrorize Gabi. Jake DiMera and Gabi manage to stop Nick and return him back into his grave.

In A Very Salem Christmas, Will Horton writes a story where Nick is still alive and he and Gabi become a couple during the holidays.

Nick returns in 2023 when he tricks Marlena Evans, Kate Roberts, and Kayla Brady into signing their souls away to Satan under the guise of Susan Banks, Jordan Ridgeway and Adrienne Kiriakis. He nearly succeeded unit Jake Lambert-DiMera appeared and revealed that the three women were still alive and that Nick only did it to cause pain to Will. Jake reminded him that Julie Olsen Williams stilled loved him and believed there was still something good in him. This convinces Nick to send the women back to Earth.

References

External links
Nick Fallon from soapcentral.com

Days of Our Lives characters
Fictional murderers
Television characters introduced in 2006
Male characters in television
Male villains
Fictional characters incorrectly presumed dead
Horton family